Coleophora fuscocuprella is a moth of the family Coleophoridae. It is found from Fennoscandia to the Pyrenees, Italy, Albania and Romania and from Ireland to Russia.

The head is shining dark bronzy-fuscous, and the antennae are dark fuscous; apical half white with dark fuscous rings, indistinct towards apex. The forewings are dark bronzy-fuscous, and the hindwings are dark grey.

There is one generation per year with adults on wing from mid-May to late June.

The larvae feed on alder (Alnus species), silver birch (Betula pendula), downy birch (Betula pubescens), European hornbeam (Carpinus betulus) and hazel (Corylus avellana). They create a lobe case with many small leaf fragments attached to it. The larvae are attached to the leaf underside, where they make a large number of relatively small fleck mines. Full-grown cases can be found in August and October. Pupation takes place in the case, usually attached to a trunk just above ground level.

References

External links
 Coleophora fuscocuprella at UKMoths

fuscocuprella
Moths described in 1855
Moths of Europe
Taxa named by Gottlieb August Wilhelm Herrich-Schäffer